Cizre District is a district of the Şırnak Province of Turkey. The seat of the district is the town of Cizre and the population was 155,182 in 2021.

Settlements 
Cizre District contains no beldes, thirty-two villages, of which one is unpopulated, and nineteen hamlets.

Villages 

 Aşağıçeşme
 Aşağıdere
 Aşağıkonak
 Bağlarbaşı
 Bozalan
 Çağıl
 Çatalköy
 Çavuşköy
 Dirsekli
 Düzova
 Erdem
 Güçlü
 Gürsü
 Havuzlu
 Katran
 Kayaköy
 Kebeli
 Keruh
 Kocapınar
 Koçtepe
 Korucu
 Kurtuluş
 Kuştepe
 Sulak
 Taşhöyük
 Tepeönü
 Uğur
 Ulaş
 Varlık
 Yakacık
 Yalıntepe
 Yeşilyurt

References 

Districts of Şırnak Province
States and territories established in 1990